Salem is the largest city in Columbiana County, Ohio, with a small district in southern Mahoning County. At the 2020 census, the city's population was 11,915. It is the principal city of the Salem micropolitan area, which includes all of Columbiana County.

Founded by the Quaker society in 1806, Salem was notably active in the abolitionist movement of the early- to mid-19th century as a hub for the American Underground Railroad. Through the 20th century, Salem served as one of many industrial towns in Northeast Ohio's Mahoning Valley region. Today, the city is a commuter town and an economic center of Columbiana County, home to Allegheny Wesleyan College and Kent State University at Salem.

History

Salem was founded by a New Jersey clockmaker, Zadok Street, and a Pennsylvanian potter, John Straughan, in 1806. The city was named after Salem, New Jersey, Street's native community. The name Salem itself is a biblical derivative of Jerusalem in the Middle East, which means "city of peace". The city's early settlers included the Religious Society of Friends, also known as Quakers, which the local school district's sports teams honor by referring to themselves collectively as the Salem Quakers. Salem was incorporated in 1830.

Radio DJ Alan Freed was born in Johnstown, Pennsylvania, and grew up in Salem. While working at a radio station in Cleveland, he coined the phrase "Rock & Roll".

Advantageously located between Cleveland and Pittsburgh, Salem thrived on an industrial-based economy. For several decades, Salem's largest corporations included American Standard Brands, Eljer, Mullins Manufacturing, Deming Pump, and Salem China. Today, American Standard, a Fresh Mark, Inc meat production facility, and several tool-and-die manufacturers remain.

Reform efforts
Salem was a center for reform activity in several ways. The Anti-Slavery Bugle, an abolitionist newspaper, was published in Salem beginning in 1845. A local group of the Progressive Friends, an association of Quakers who separated from the main body partly to be freer to work for such causes as abolitionism and women's rights, formed in Salem in 1849. The local school board at that time was composed entirely of abolitionists.

Salem was the site of an annual conference, the Anti-Slavery Fair, whose purpose was to raise money for anti-slavery activities.

In April 1850, Salem hosted the first Women's Rights Convention in Ohio, the third such convention in the United States. (The first was the Seneca Falls Convention of 1848; the second was the Rochester Convention two weeks later.) The Salem Convention was the first of these conventions to be organized on a statewide basis. All the convention officers were women. Men were not allowed to vote, sit on the platform, or speak during the convention. The male spectators were supportive, however, and when the convention was over, they created an organization of their own and endorsed the actions of the women's convention.

Historic districts
Two sections of the city are designated National Register historic districts: the South Lincoln Avenue Historic District (designated 1993) and the Salem Downtown Historic District (designated 1995), which includes several of the town's monumental and architecturally distinctive homes and businesses.

Other city properties listed on the National Register of Historic Places include the Burchfield Homestead, home to painter Charles E. Burchfield from ages 5 to 28, the John Street House and Daniel Howell Hise House, both Underground Railroad stations, and the First United Methodist Church.

Geography

Salem is located at  (40.900885, −80.852831).

Salem is the largest incorporated place by area in Columbiana County.

The city of Salem is mostly surrounded by Perry Township. As with other Ohio townships, Perry Township has been subject to annexation in recent years. Residents of land annexed to the city of Salem enjoy all benefits other city residents enjoy, and by Ohio law are now residents of the city. Several acres of Salem Township and Green Township were annexed into the city limits in 2000 and 2001. Other actions to spur economic development undertaken around the same time annexed specific land: in 1999,  of Salem Township were granted police and fire protection, snow removal service, and other standard services already provided by the city by ordinance passed by the city government.

Demographics

2010 census
As of the census of 2010, there were 12,303 people, 5,272 households, and 3,118 families living in the city. The racial makeup of the city was 95.9% White, 0.7% African American, 0.2% Native American, 0.4% Asian, 1.6% from other races, and 1.2% from two or more races. Hispanic or Latino of any race were 2.5% of the population.

There were 5,272 households, of which 26.3% had children under the age of 18 living with them, 41.5% were married couples living together, 12.3% had a female householder with no husband present, 5.3% had a male householder with no wife present, and 40.9% were non-families. 34.9% of all households were made up of individuals, and 15.9% had someone living alone who was 65 years of age or older. The average household size was 2.25 and the average family size was 2.87.

The median age in the city was 42.8 years. 21.2% of residents were under the age of 18; 7.7% were between the ages of 18 and 24; 23.6% were from 25 to 44; 28.3% were from 45 to 64; and 19.1% were 65 years of age or older. The gender makeup of the city was 47.9% male and 52.1% female.

2000 census
As of the census of 2000, there were 12,197 people, 5,146 households, and 3,247 families living in the city. The racial makeup of the city was 98.35% White, 0.52% African American, 0.09% Native American, 0.34% Asian, 0.02% Pacific Islander, 0.08% from other races, and 0.59% from two or more races. Hispanic or Latino of any race were 0.54% of the population.

There were 5,146 households, out of which 28.1% had children under the age of 18 living with them, 48.7% were married couples living together, 10.6% had a female householder with no husband present, and 36.9% were non-families. 32.8% of all households were made up of individuals, and 17.1% had someone living alone who was 65 years of age or older. The average household size was 2.31 and the average family size was 2.92.

In the city the population was spread out, with 22.8% under the age of 18, 8.1% from 18 to 24, 27.4% from 25 to 44, 21.6% from 45 to 64, and 20.1% who were 65 years of age or older. The median age was 40 years. For every 100 females, there were 84.9 males. For every 100 females age 18 and over, there were 81.0 males.

The median income for a household in the city was $30,006, and the median income for a family was $40,191. Males had a median income of $31,630 versus $19,471 for females. The per capita income for the city was $16,579. About 9.8% of families and 11.7% of the population were below the poverty line, including 17.9% of those under age 18 and 9.8% of those age 65 or over.

Economy 
According to the Sustainable Opportunity Development Center in Salem, the top employers in the city are:

Government 
Salem operates under a chartered mayor–council government. Eight council members are elected as a legislature for two-year terms, which constitutes four separate wards, three at-large districts, and a council president. An independently elected mayor serves as an executive. The current mayor is Cyndi Baronzzi Dickey (R), and the current council president is Sara Baronzzi (R). The mayor, auditor, treasurer, and law director are all elected to four-year terms.

Education

Primary and secondary
Salem is served by the Salem City School District. The schools operated by the district are:
 Buckeye Elementary School, 1200 Buckeye Avenue, grades K-2
 Reilly Elementary School, 491 Reilly Avenue, grades 3–4
 Southeast Elementary School, 2200 Merle Road, grades 5–6
 Salem Junior High School, 1200 E 6th Street, grades 7–8
 Salem High School, 1200 E 6th Street, grades 9–12

The Roman Catholic Diocese of Youngstown operates the private St. Paul Elementary School for grades K-6.

Postsecondary
Allegheny Wesleyan College is a private, four-year liberal arts college in Salem that grants bachelor's and associate degrees in ministry and theology-related disciplines.

Kent State University operates a satellite campus, Kent State University at Salem, with one building in the city proper and another just outside the city limits in Salem Township. The campus grants associate's degrees and bachelor's degrees, and also offers introductory programs that can be completed at the main campus.

Transportation
The following highways pass through Salem: 
  U.S. Route 62
  State Route 9
  State Route 14
  State Route 173
  State Route 344

Notable people
 Dustin Bates, lead singer and songwriter for STARSET and formerly Downplay
 Chalkley Beeson, businessman, musician, lawman, and owner of Long Branch Saloon
 Charles Burchfield, 20th-century painter and visionary artist
 John Allen Campbell, first governor of the Wyoming Territory
 Jason Candle, NCAA football coach for the Toledo Rockets
 Joe Daley, jazz saxophonist, composer, and teacher
 Max Fisher, businessman and philanthropist, served as an advisor to U.S. presidents for Israeli connections
 Alan Freed, disc jockey, coined the term "rock and roll"
 Daniel Howell Hise, diarist and abolitionist whose home was on the Underground Railroad
 Elisha Hunt, principal founder of the company that built and operated the historic steamboat Enterprise
 Rich Karlis, National Football League placekicker
 Kirk Lowdermilk, National Football League center
 Jerry Meals, Major League Baseball umpire
 Jerri Nielsen, physician who administered a biopsy and chemotherapy to herself in Antarctica
 John Hunt Painter, Quaker abolitionist who sent the firearms to John Brown for the raid on Harper's Ferry
 Marius Robinson, minister, abolitionist and editor of The Anti-Slavery Bugle
 Michael Rulli, member of the Ohio State Senate from the 33rd District
 Webster Street, lawyer who served as chief justice of the Arizona Territorial Supreme Court
 Charles C. Williamson, librarian
 Lloyd Yoder, NCAA football tackle and College Football Hall of Fame inductee

See also
 USS Salem (CM-11)

References

External links

 City website
 http://www.SODCenter.com Economic Development website
 Salem Historical Society
 Salem Public Library
 Salem Chamber of Commerce
 Salem A Quaker City History

Cities in Columbiana County, Ohio
Populated places established in 1806
Cities in Mahoning County, Ohio
Populated places on the Underground Railroad
1806 establishments in Ohio
Cities in Ohio